You Complete Me is the second EP of South Korean boy group ONF. It was released on June 7, 2018 by WM Entertainment and distributed by Stone Music Entertainment. The EP consisted of six tracks with the title track "Complete".

Background and Release
On May 15, 2018, WM Entertainment announced that ONF will make their comeback on June 7, 2018 with the group's 2nd mini album "You Complete Me". On May 27, 2018, The group's comeback schedule teaser image  was released. On May 30, 2018, The album's track list of the group's 2nd mini album was revealed. On May 31, 2018, WM Entertainment released the lyrics teaser image of their lead single,"Complete". On June 1, 2018, WM Entertainment released the unofficial member's individual teaser image together with their highlight medley for the album. On June 3, 2018, WM Entertainment released the second set of member's individual teaser image.

Promotion
On June 7, 2018, ONF performed their new second album, "You Complete Me" on the showcase event that was held at Hoe Hung-dong New World, Central District, Seoul. All the seven members of the group attended the conference.The title track "Complete" is a dance song featuring a feeling of conflicting feelings, sometimes even though it sounds like a screaming boy's voice.

The group made their comeback, performing their lead single,"Complete" and "Fly Me to The Moon" on June 7 on Mnet's M Countdown.

Track listing

Charts

Weekly Chart

Monthly Chart

Release history

References

ONF (band) EPs
2018 EPs